Lists of churches in Cambridgeshire may be found in the six lists for each of the ceremonial county's constituent districts. A summary of statistics is given below.

*numbers may not add to total due to some churches counting towards more than one denomination

1includes twenty college chapels

Cambridgeshire